Meneghetti is a surname of Italian origin. Notable people with the surname include: 

 Egidio Meneghetti (1892–1961), Italian physician and pharmacologist
 Gino Meneghetti (1878–1976), Italian thief
 Mario Meneghetti (1893–1942), Italian footballer
 Ildo Meneghetti, Brazilian governor of Rio Grande do Sul

References

 
Italian-language surnames